A significant early season tornadic event affected portions of the Midwestern and Southern United States at the end of January 2013. The first signs of the outbreak came on January 23 as the Storm Prediction Center (SPC) detailed the eastward progression of a shortwave trough into an increasingly unstable air mass across portions of the lower Mississippi Valley; however, considerable uncertainty in the placement of severe thunderstorms caused the SPC to remove their threat outline. Succeeding many changes in the forecast, a Day 1 Moderate risk was issued for January 29, warning of the potential for widespread/significant damaging winds and a few strong tornadoes. The threat shifted eastward on January 30, encompassing a large section of the Southeastern United States. By late that day, the shortwave trough tracked northeastward into New England, ending the severe weather threat.

Between January 29–30, a total of 66 tornadoes were confirmed, making the event the seventh-largest winter tornado outbreak and fourth-largest January tornado outbreak on record. It was also the largest January tornado outbreak in Middle Tennessee on record and the second-largest tornado outbreak for any calendar month there. The strongest tornado, an EF3, impacted portions of Adairsville, Georgia, causing significant damage to an industrial building and several homes. One man was killed after a tree was downed on his mobile home, ending the longest-running streak without a tornado fatality in the United States which began on June 25, 2012. Another man who was taking shelter in a shed was killed by straight-line winds when a tree landed on the structure. A total of 25 people sustained injuries. Overall, the tornadoes resulted in an estimated $350 million (2013 USD) in damage.

Meteorological synopsis
The final days of January brought a major tornado outbreak. In preparation for the event, the Storm Prediction Center outlined a rare Day 7 outlook region for portions of the Lower Mississippi Valley and Ark-La-Tex region. This region was subsequently removed by January 25 due to significant model differences, but was once again introduced in Day 4 and 5 convective outlook regions the following day. A Day 3 slight risk of severe weather was issued on January 27 from western Indiana down to central Texas, with the SPC warning of the potential for a significant severe weather event. A moderate risk of severe weather was forecasted in the afternoon January 28 Day 2 outlook, making it the fifth Day 2 moderate outlook issued in January over the past 15 years. While the main threat was expected to be damaging winds, produced by a potent squall line, the SPC also warned of a few strong, long-lived tornadoes. Numerous tornado watches were issued throughout the day as a squall line developed and worked eastward into the morning hours of January 30. In addition, a few semi-discrete supercells formed in the Lower Mississippi Valley. Multiple tornadoes touched down ahead of and along the squall line.

Confirmed tornadoes

January 29 event

January 30 event

See also
 List of United States tornadoes from January to February 2013
 Tornadoes of 2013

Notes

References

Tornadoes of 2013
2013 natural disasters in the United States
F3 tornadoes
Tornadoes in Tennessee
Tornadoes in Georgia (U.S. state)
Tornadoes in Kentucky
Tornadoes in Missouri
Tornadoes in Arkansas
Tornadoes in Alabama
January 2013 events in the United States